Ludwig Heinrich Freiherr von Nicolay (25 December 1737, in Strasbourg, in Monrepos north of Vyborg) was a German poet of the Enlightenment. He served as President of the St. Petersburg Academy of Sciences between 1798 and 1803.

Nicolay was the son of a Strasbourg archivist. He graduated from the University of Strasbourg with a degree in law. Like his father, he served as a librarian to a string of rich nobles. Prince Dmitry Gallitsyn employed Nicolay as his secretary in Vienna and Paris where he came to know Voltaire, Diderot,  d'Alembert and other intellectuals of the Enlightenment. 

In 1769 Nicolay was invited to the Russian Empire to be a teacher of logic for the future Emperor Paul I of Russia. In 1782 (on the same day as Goethe) Nicolay was ennobled and granted the title of baron by Joseph II. When Paul became emperor, he appointed Nicolay to run the St. Petersburg Academy of Sciences (15 April 1798 – 2 June 1803). 

Nicolay's private library, collections (cameos, letters and other documents) and pictures are now in the possession of the Finnish National Library in Helsinki. This library is a very rare example of Russian libraries from the age of Enlightenment.

In 1803 Baron von Nicolay settled into retirement at his estate Monrepos north of Vyborg. This estate belonged to the Nicolay family from 1788 to 1944 (when Vyborg was subsumed into the Soviet Union).

Collected works 
 Elegien und Briefe. Straßburg 1760
 Verse und Prosa. Basel 1773 (2 Bde.)
 Vermischte Gedichte. Berlin 1778-1786 (9 Bde.)
 Vermischte Gedichte und prosaische Schriften. Berlin 1792-1810 (8 Bde.)
 Theatralische Werke. Königsberg 1811 (2 Bde.)
 Poetische Werke. Wien 1817 (4 Bde.)

References 

 Peter von Gerschau: Aus dem Leben des Freiherrn Heinrich Ludwig von Nicolay. Perthes & Besser, Hamburg 1834.
 Edmund Heier: L. H. Nicolay (1737-1820) and his contemporaries. Martinus Nijhoff, The Hague 1965.
 Edmund Heier: L. H. Nicolay (1737-1820) as an exponent of neo-classicism. Bouvier, Bonn 1981.

1737 births
1820 deaths
Alsatian-German people
Barons of Austria
Eastern Orthodox Christians from Germany
Converts to Eastern Orthodoxy from Protestantism
German untitled nobility
German poets
Full members of the Saint Petersburg Academy of Sciences
Writers from Strasbourg
Age of Enlightenment
University of Strasbourg alumni
Russian librarians
Writers from Vyborg
German male poets